Nicklas Kulti and Mikael Tillström were the defending champions, and lost in the semifinals to the runners-up.

Piet Norval and Kevin Ullyett won the title, defeating Jan-Michael Gambill and Scott Humphries 7–5, 6–3 in the final.

Seeds

Draw

Draw

References
Draw

1999 Stockholm Open
1999 ATP Tour